An urban legend states that the first pair of Levi's jeans was made of hemp canvas. In fact, the fabric was cotton, made by the Amoskeag Cotton and Woolen Manufacturing Company.

The misinformation may have been spread by Jack Herer.

In March, 2019, Levi's did actually begin allowing the manufacturing of hemp jeans with its brand.

Footnotes

References

Sources
 
 

Cannabis hoaxes
Levi Strauss & Co.